William Henry Bruce  (12 July 1895 – 7 December 1977) was an Australian rules footballer who played with Melbourne in the Victorian Football League (VFL).

Prior to playing VFL football, Bruce served in World War I, being awarded the Military Medal in 1918 "for gallantry in the field when he established a communications station under fire".

Notes

External links 

1895 births
Australian rules footballers from Melbourne
Melbourne Football Club players
1977 deaths
People from Murrumbeena, Victoria
Australian military personnel of World War I
Military personnel from Melbourne
Australian recipients of the Military Medal